Zsófia Susányi (born 16 February 1992, in Szeged) is a Hungarian tennis player.

Susányi won one singles and two doubles titles on the ITF tour in her career. On 25 October 2010, she reached her best singles ranking of world number 592. On 18 July 2011, she peaked at world number 562 in the doubles rankings.

Susányi made four appearances for the Hungary Fed Cup team in 2009 and 2010.

ITF finals (3–2)

Singles (1–1)

Doubles (2–1)

Fed Cup participation

Singles

Doubles

References

External links 
 
 
 

1992 births
Living people
Sportspeople from Szeged
Hungarian female tennis players
California Golden Bears women's tennis players
21st-century Hungarian women